Jharsuguda is a Vidhan Sabha constituency of Jharsuguda district.
It includes Jharsuguda, Kirmira block, Laikera block,  Kolabira block and part of Jharsuguda block.

Members of Legislative Assembly 

Sixteen elections have been held in the constituency from 1961 to 2019, resulting in the elections of:
 2019: Naba Kishore Das (BJD)
 2014: Naba Kishore Das (Congress)
 2009: Naba Kishore Das (Congress)
 2004: Kishore Kumar Mohanty (BJD)
 2000: Kishore Kumar Mohanty (BJD)
 1995: Birendra Chandra Pande (Congress)
 1990: Kishore Kumar Mohanty (Janata Dal)
 1985: Birendra Chandra Pande (Congress)
 1980: Birendra Chandra Pande (Congress)
 1977: Shairindri Nayak (Congress)
 1974: Shairindri Nayak (Congress)
 1971: Jhasaketana Sahu (OJC)
 1967: Murali Prasad Mishra (Swatantra)
 1961: Binod Bihari Bariha (Congress)
 1957: Bijaya Kumar Pani (Congress), and Manohar Nayak (Ganatantra Parishad)
 1951: Bijaya Kumar Pani (Congress)

Election results

2019 
In 2019 election Biju Janata Dal candidate Naba Kishore Das, defeated Bharatiya Janata Party candidate Dinesh Kumar Jain by 45,699 votes.

2014 
In 2014 election Indian National Congress candidate Naba Kishore Das, defeated Biju Janata Dal candidate Kishore Kumar Mohanty by 11,563 votes.

2009 
In 2009 election Indian National Congress candidate Naba Kishore Das, defeated Biju Janata Dal candidate Kishore Kumar Mohanty by 22,516 votes.

See also
List of constituencies of the Odisha Legislative Assembly
Jharsuguda district

Notes

References

Jharsuguda district
Assembly constituencies of Odisha